In mathematics, the Alvis–Curtis duality is a duality operation on the characters of a reductive group over a finite field, introduced by  and studied by his student .  introduced a similar duality operation for Lie algebras.

Alvis–Curtis duality has order 2 and is an isometry on generalized characters.

 discusses Alvis–Curtis duality in detail.

Definition

The dual ζ* of a character ζ of a finite group G with a split BN-pair is defined to be

Here the sum is over all subsets J of the set R of simple roots of the Coxeter system of G. The character ζ is the truncation of ζ to the parabolic subgroup PJ of the subset J, given by restricting ζ to PJ and then taking the space of invariants of the unipotent radical of PJ, and  ζ is the induced representation of G. (The operation of  truncation is the adjoint functor of parabolic induction.)

Examples

The dual of the trivial character 1 is the Steinberg character.
 showed that the dual of a Deligne–Lusztig character R is εGεTR.
The dual of a cuspidal character χ is (–1)|Δ|χ, where Δ is the set of simple roots.
The dual of the Gelfand–Graev character is the character taking value |ZF|ql on the regular unipotent elements and vanishing elsewhere.

References

Representation theory
Duality theories